Xu Yan (born 4 November 1981 in Beijing) is a female Chinese judoka who competed at the 2008 Summer Olympics in the Lightweight (52–57 kg) event.

Major performances
2003 World Championships - 7th -57 kg class;
2003 Asian Championships - 5th -57 kg class;
2005 European Tour Korea - 3rd -57 kg class;
2006 World Cup Team Tournament - 3rd;
2007 World Team Championships - 1st;
2008 Paris Super World Cup - 2nd -57 kg class

See also
China at the 2008 Summer Olympics

References

External links
 
 
 
 http://2008teamchina.olympic.cn/index.php/personview/personsen/576

1981 births
Living people
Judoka at the 2008 Summer Olympics
Olympic bronze medalists for China
Olympic judoka of China
Sportspeople from Beijing
Olympic medalists in judo
Asian Games medalists in judo
Medalists at the 2008 Summer Olympics
Judoka at the 2006 Asian Games
Chinese female judoka
Asian Games gold medalists for China
Medalists at the 2006 Asian Games
20th-century Chinese women
21st-century Chinese women